SS501 Collection is South Korean boy band SS501's sixth Korean mini-album released on July 21, 2009 by DSP Media.

This was the first album to release after the return of Kim Hyun-joong (participating in Boys Over Flowers during previous album promotions,) and Park Jung-min (who was previously participating in musical, Grease.) and SS501's project group and unit album, U R Man,

The album consists of a solo tracks for each member that showcase each member's individual talents and charisma: Kim Hyun-joong's edgy R&B dance track "Please Be Nice To Me"; Heo Young-saeng's self-written ballad song "Nameless Memory"; Kim Kyu-jong's light and energetic urban pop song "Wuss Up" featuring Taewan a.k.a. C-Luv & Star Trak; Park Jung-min's mid-tempo ballad "If You Cannot" featuring Ji-sun; and Kim Hyung-jun's sexy dance-song "Hey G". Aside from solo songs, the album also included the group song "I Won't Be A Coward" at the end, which was previously included on the Japan Version of U R Man album.  Moreover, SS501 shot a sensational 20-minute blockbuster-style music video that brings the songs and members together for a thrilling musical story in which Kim Hyun-joong, Park Jung-min, and Kim Kyu-jong play rival killers.

In August 2009, SS501 released a limited and deluxe version of the album in Taiwan.

Track listing

Release history

References

External links

 
 

SS501 albums
2009 EPs